Inveralmond Community High School is an 11–18, mixed comprehensive school in the Ladywell area of Livingston and serves a cluster of six primary schools.

The school roll is currently 1105.

Ian Colquhoun, disabled author and historian, attended Inveralmond from 1992 to 1994, as part of the intake of students following closure of Craigshill High School.

External links
Inveralmond Community High School's page on Scottish Schools Online

Secondary schools in West Lothian